The Puerto Rico Highways and Transportation Authority (PRHTA)  (ACT) is the government-owned corporation of Puerto Rico charged with constructing, operating, and maintaining roads, bridges, avenues, highways, tunnels, public parkings, tolls, and other transit facilities in Puerto Rico. The Authority is also charged with providing an integrated transportation system to Puerto Rico and its people.

Public-private partnerships

Executive directors

2009present: Rubén Hernández Gregorat

See also
 List of highways in Puerto Rico

References

External links
  

 
Puerto Rico Department of Transportation and Public Works
Government-owned corporations of Puerto Rico